The Daejeon Hanbat Baseball Stadium, also known as the Hanwha Life Eagles Park due to sponsorship reasons, is a baseball park in Daejeon, South Korea. The stadium is located in the vicinity of Daejeon Station. Located in Daejeon Hanbat Sports Complex with other main sports facilities in Daejeon, it is currently used as the primary home ballpark of Hanwha Eagles of the KBO League.

Built in 1964, the ballpark was once nicknamed as the "Ping-Pong Table" for having the smallest outfield dimension among professional ballparks in South Korea. But the ballpark underwent a series of large scale renovations with capacity extension from 2011 winter to 2012 spring, and outfield expansion in the winter of 2012. After the renovation, the ballpark had a second-largest outfield dimension in South Korea at the time, and a seating capacity of 13,000.

From 1982 to 1984, it was the home ballpark of the OB Bears. In 1986, the Binggrae Eagles debuted as the KBO's seventh franchise, and they took on Daejeon Hanbat Baseball Stadium as their home.

Transportation
The ballpark can be accessed by public transit. Local bus #620 from the station runs directly past the stadium. Out of town visitors via express bus East Daejon Bus Terminal can ride a taxi, which requires approximately 6,000 KRW. Limited parking is shared with the nearby sports venues.

References

External links

1964 establishments in South Korea
Baseball venues in South Korea
Baseball Stadium, Hanbat
Sport in Daejeon
Hanwha Eagles
Doosan Bears
Sports venues completed in 1964
20th-century architecture in South Korea